Amevi is the personal motor yacht of Indian steel magnate Lakshmi Mittal. Mittal ordered the yacht in 2007; it was built at Oceanco shipyard in the Netherlands.

Design and engine 

See also
 List of yachts built by Oceanco

References 

Yachts

2007 ships
Motor yachts